Samary may refer to:

Samary, Poland
Catherine Samary, French academic, author and political activist
Jeanne Samary (1857–1890), French actress